Senthil Ganesh is an Indian folk, playback singer and actor. He rose to prominence after winning the 6th edition of the Airtel Super Singer in 2018 which was aired in Star Vijay. He made his acting debut with the film Thirudu Pogatha Manasu (2014). He married fellow folk singer Rajalakshmi in 2012.

Career 
He pursued his interest in folk music Naattupurapaattu at the age of five and started recording songs at his young age after learning the basics of the music. He learnt music from Chella Thangaiah and recorded his first song Mannuketha Raagangal at the age of ten. He completed his primary and secondary education at a school in Alangudi, Pudukkottai and pursued his higher education at a musical college in Trichy. He has also conducted over 100 folk music concerts and has performed in many local cultural religious functions. Senthil also received the Doctor of Letters for Tamil Literature. In 2014, he was roped into play a lead role in the film Thirudu Pogatha Manasu by his music guru turned director Chella Thangaiah and the film marked Senthil's acting debut.

He then took part in Super Singer 6 along with his wife as one of 16 contestants in the season and became popular in the show for singing mostly folk songs. He emerged as the winner of the contest while his wife received a consolation prize. After taking part in the contest, he received film opportunities and collaborated with director Chella Thangaiah for the second time and played the lead role in Karimugan (2018). It was initially reported that Senthil Ganesh would make his playback singing debut after being approached by music director D. Imman with the film Seema Raja in 2018.

However he along with his wife Rajalakshmi made their playback singing debut together in early 2018 and both rose to prominence after crooning the sleeper hit song Chinna Machan for the film Charlie Chaplin 2. He collaborated with another folk singer Rockstar Ramani Ammal and crooned the song Sirukki for the film Kaappaan which became popular among the rural people.

He also appeared in the reality television show Mr and Mrs Chinnathirai with his wife in 2019.

In 2019 he and his wife Rajalakshmi spoke critically about Indian Prime Minister Narendra Modi on social media.

Filmography 

 Thirudu Pogatha Manasu (2014)
 Karimugan (2018)

Discography

References

External links 

1980 births
Living people
Tamil playback singers
Indian male playback singers
Indian actors
Singers from Tamil Nadu
21st-century Indian actors
21st-century Indian singers
Indian male folk singers
Indian folk singers
Musicians from Madurai
Musicians from Tamil Nadu
People from Pudukkottai
21st-century Indian male singers